Alan J. Grodzinsky is an American scientist and Professor of Electrical, Mechanical and Biological Engineering and Director of the Center for Biomedical Engineering at MIT. He graduated in Electrical Engineering from MIT in 1971, obtaining a doctorate three years later under the supervision of James Melcher, with a thesis on membrane electromechanics.

Grodzinsky is widely recognized for his research investigating the mechanical, chemical and electrical properties of connective tissue, including studies on cartilage tissue engineering, with implications for understanding and curing diseases such as osteoarthritis. He has published over 315 peer reviewed papers which have been cited almost 30,000 times in Google Scholar. He has supervised 25 post-doctoral candidates, 52 Ph.D./Sc.D. students, 2 M.D. students, 52 M.S. students and 63 B.S students. He has been honored with the 2018 Orthopaedic Research Society Outstanding Achievement in Mentoring Award for his lifelong commitment to excellence in mentoring trainees both in his lab and around the world.

Grodzinsky was a founding Fellow of the American Institute of Medical and Biological Engineering in 1993. He has served as the President of the Bioelectrical Repair and Growth Society (1986–87), Chairman of the Gordon Research Conference on Musculoskeletal Biology & Bioengineering (1990), President of the International Cartilage Repair Society (1998-2000) and President of the Orthopaedic Research Society (2007–08). He received a NIH Merit Award in 1994.

Grodzinsky is married to Gail Grodzinsky (née Meyer) and has a son Michael Grodzinsky and lives in Massachusetts.

External links
MIT press release, NIH merit award 1994
MIT probes cartilage on nanoscale
 http://meche.mit.edu/people/index.html?id=34

Living people
MIT School of Engineering faculty
Year of birth missing (living people)
Fellows of the American Institute for Medical and Biological Engineering